Neoregelia chlorosticta is a species of flowering plant in the genus Neoregelia. This species is endemic to Brazil.

Cultivars

 Neoregelia 'Accord'
 Neoregelia 'Amethyst'
 Neoregelia 'Amity'
 Neoregelia 'Anemone'
 Neoregelia 'Antonio'
 Neoregelia 'Awareness'
 Neoregelia 'Bambi'
 Neoregelia 'Beau'
 Neoregelia 'Beelzebub'
 Neoregelia 'Best Bet'
 Neoregelia 'Black Jack'
 Neoregelia 'Bliss'
 Neoregelia 'Born of Fire'
 Neoregelia 'Bright Spot'
 Neoregelia 'Bronze Beauty'
 Neoregelia 'Burnished Copper'
 Neoregelia 'Charm'
 Neoregelia 'Charmian'
 Neoregelia 'Chloromarcon'
 Neoregelia 'Cockatoo'
 Neoregelia 'Cuddle'
 Neoregelia 'Dainty Doll'
 Neoregelia 'Dark Delight'
 Neoregelia 'Dark Glory'
 Neoregelia 'Dazzle'
 Neoregelia 'Dexter'
 Neoregelia 'Dimboola'
 Neoregelia 'Divine'
 Neoregelia 'Dobell'
 Neoregelia 'Domino'
 Neoregelia 'Down and Out'
 Neoregelia 'Dr. Oeser (Dr. O)'
 Neoregelia 'Duffer'
 Neoregelia 'Dusky'
 Neoregelia 'Dynamo'
 Neoregelia 'Envy'
 Neoregelia 'Etching'
 Neoregelia 'Ethereal'
 Neoregelia 'Fabulous'
 Neoregelia 'Fair Maid'
 Neoregelia 'Fame and Fortune'
 Neoregelia 'Fashionable'
 Neoregelia 'Feuerland'
 Neoregelia 'Fiddlesticks'
 Neoregelia 'Fidget'
 Neoregelia 'Filigree'
 Neoregelia 'Finery'
 Neoregelia 'Fire Bird'
 Neoregelia 'Flaming Copper'
 Neoregelia 'For Olwen'
 Neoregelia 'Frazzle'
 Neoregelia 'Freckle Face'
 Neoregelia 'Frolic'
 Neoregelia 'Fuddle'
 Neoregelia 'Galactic'
 Neoregelia 'Gay Quilting'
 Neoregelia 'Gay Rebel'
 Neoregelia 'Gingerbread'
 Neoregelia 'Gipsy Moth'
 Neoregelia 'Good Faith'
 Neoregelia 'Grace Goode'
 Neoregelia 'Grace Goode Girl'
 Neoregelia 'Gwenavalia'
 Neoregelia 'Heart of Gold'
 Neoregelia 'Hosanna'
 Neoregelia 'Hotpants'
 Neoregelia 'Innocence'
 Neoregelia 'Jackpot'
 Neoregelia 'Jamboree'
 Neoregelia 'Jazzer'
 Neoregelia 'Jodie'
 Neoregelia 'Jubilant'
 Neoregelia 'Just Perky'
 Neoregelia 'Kasper'
 Neoregelia 'Kathryn'
 Neoregelia 'Ketchup'
 Neoregelia 'Kindly Light'
 Neoregelia 'Kiwi Magic'
 Neoregelia 'Krasny'
 Neoregelia 'Kybosh'
 Neoregelia 'Lasting Memories'
 Neoregelia 'Laudable'
 Neoregelia 'Lemon Drop'
 Neoregelia 'Lena Regina'
 Neoregelia 'Little Beauty'
 Neoregelia 'Little Dotty'
 Neoregelia 'Little Red Hen'
 Neoregelia 'Little Rose'
 Neoregelia 'Lorelle'
 Neoregelia 'Lost Weekend'
 Neoregelia 'Lovable'
 Neoregelia 'Love Me Tender'
 Neoregelia 'Lovers Leap'
 Neoregelia 'Magic Light'
 Neoregelia 'Make Believe'
 Neoregelia 'Marble Throat'
 Neoregelia 'Merv's Rubella'
 Neoregelia 'Meteor Shower'
 Neoregelia 'Morning Star'
 Neoregelia 'Much Ado'
 Neoregelia 'Muggins'
 Neoregelia 'Mystic'
 Neoregelia 'Negligee'
 Neoregelia 'Night Sky'
 Neoregelia 'Old Smoothie'
 Neoregelia 'Orange Beauty'
 Neoregelia 'Pageant'
 Neoregelia 'Panama Queen'
 Neoregelia 'Pappilon'
 Neoregelia 'Paradise Point'
 Neoregelia 'Polkadot'
 Neoregelia 'Ravishing'
 Neoregelia 'Reckless'
 Neoregelia 'Red Appeal'
 Neoregelia 'Red Beauty'
 Neoregelia 'Red Face'
 Neoregelia 'Red Marble'
 Neoregelia 'Red Ribbons'
 Neoregelia 'Reddy Set Go'
 Neoregelia 'Reward'
 Neoregelia 'Robust'
 Neoregelia 'Rojoverde'
 Neoregelia 'Rot Chianti'
 Neoregelia 'Rubeo'
 Neoregelia 'Ruby Jean'
 Neoregelia 'Russet Beauty'
 Neoregelia 'Scandalous'
 Neoregelia 'Scarlet Red'
 Neoregelia 'Scarlet Star'
 Neoregelia 'Sitting Pretty'
 Neoregelia 'Slow Joe'
 Neoregelia 'Small Wager'
 Neoregelia 'Smart Image'
 Neoregelia 'Solar Eclipse'
 Neoregelia 'Spotted Fire Bird'
 Neoregelia 'Star Of Bethlehem'
 Neoregelia 'Sugar and Spice'
 Neoregelia 'Sweetheart'
 Neoregelia 'Sweetie Pie'
 Neoregelia 'Tan Beauty'
 Neoregelia 'Tascha'
 Neoregelia 'Tickle Your Fancy'
 Neoregelia 'Top Brass'
 Neoregelia 'Turbulent'
 Neoregelia 'Valley'
 Neoregelia 'Verna'
 Neoregelia 'Veyron'
 Neoregelia 'Wally'
 Neoregelia 'Willy Wagtail'
 Neoregelia 'Wine Charm'
 Neoregelia 'Wine Gay'
 Neoregelia 'Wine Glow'
 Neoregelia 'Winner'

References

BSI Cultivar Registry Retrieved 11 October 2009

chlorosticta
Flora of Brazil